Bârghiș is a commune in the northern part of Sibiu County.  It is situated in central Romania, in the historical region of Transylvania. The commune is composed of six villages: Apoș, Bârghiș, Ighișu Vechi, Pelișor, Vecerd, and Zlagna. Pelișor has a fortified church.

At the 2011 census, 86.4% of inhabitants were Romanians, 5.9% Roma, 5.2% Hungarians and 0.7% Germans.

Natives 
Ioan Ghip, poet

References

Communes in Sibiu County
Localities in Transylvania